Brian Hall (born June 5, 1961) is an American former soccer referee from northern California. He started his professional career as an assistant referee in the NASL at age 19.  Hall was a FIFA referee from 1992 until he retired in 2007 at the mandatory retirement age of 45.  He refereed two games in the 2002 FIFA World Cup.  He was also named Major League Soccer Referee of the Year in 2003, 2005 2006, and 2007. Hall served as the US Soccer Manager of Referee Assessment and Training until 2010. He became the first Director of Referees for CONCACAF in December 2010 and held that post until December 2013. Hall is currently the Match Official Development Manager for the Professional Referee Organization (PRO).

In March 2016, he was appointed as CONCACAF's director of refereeing.

World Cup matches officiated

References

External links
 CNRA Homepage

1961 births
Living people
American soccer referees
FIFA World Cup referees
2002 FIFA World Cup referees
CONCACAF Gold Cup referees
CONCACAF Champions League referees
Major League Soccer referees
AFC Asian Cup referees
Sportspeople from California